R401 road  may refer to:
 R401 road (Ireland)
 R401 road (South Africa)